Fireflies is a novel by Shiva Naipaul originally published in 1970. It was his first book, a comic novel set in Trinidad. In an essay in An Unfinished Journey, Naipaul described how in 1968 as a final year student at Oxford University studying Chinese, he had been moved to write down a sentence, which proved to be the beginning of his first novel, which he then worked on for the next two years. The novel was hailed on publication, winning the Jock Campbell New Statesman Award, the John Llewellyn Rhys Prize and the Winifred Holtby Memorial Prize.

Writer Martin Amis said of Fireflies

References

1970 novels
Novels set in Trinidad and Tobago
John Llewellyn Rhys Prize-winning works